Trichosea is a genus of moths of the family Noctuidae.

Species
Trichosea ainu (Wileman, 1911)
Trichosea androdes (Prout, 1924)
Trichosea champa (Moore, 1879)
Trichosea diffusa Sugi, 1986
Trichosea leucotaenia (Prout, 1924)
Trichosea ludifica (Linnaeus, 1758)
Trichosea mjobergi (Prout, 1926)
Trichosea nigricatena (Prout, 1922)
Trichosea tamsi (Prout, 1924)

References
Genus info

Pantheinae